The Criterium d'Abruzzo was a single-day road cycling held annually in the region of Abruzzo. First held in 1993, it has not been contested since 2004, despite having been scheduled for the 2005 UCI Europe Tour.

Winners

References

Cycle races in Italy
Recurring sporting events established in 1993
Recurring sporting events disestablished in 2004
1993 establishments in Italy
Defunct cycling races in Italy